Ectors saga (or Hectors saga) is a medieval Icelandic romance saga.

Synopsis 

Kalinke and Mitchell summarise the saga thus:

Composed in Iceland, presumably in the late fourteenth or early fifteenth century. Ector, a descendant of King Priam of Troy, and six knights in his service decide to separate for a year to seek adventure. The fates of the several knights are related serially. All but one of the knights are successful in their undertakings. The sixth knight, Aprival, boasts to King Troilus of Mesopotanea of the superiority of Ector and his companions, but is defeated in a tournament by Eneas, son of King Troilus. When Aprival does not return on the appointed day, Ector leads his army in search of him. Eneas is captured by Ector, but wins his freedom through the intercession of his sister Trobil, who agrees to marry Ector.

Manuscripts 

Kalinke and Mitchell identified the following manuscripts of the saga:

Editions and translations 

 Agnete Loth (ed.), Late Medieval Icelandic Romances, Editiones Arnamagæanae, series B, 20–24, 5 vols Copenhagen: Munksgaard, 1962–65), I 79-186. [The principal scholarly edition.]

References 

Chivalric sagas
Icelandic literature
Old Norse literature